Sage is a ghost town in the far southwestern part of Lincoln County, Wyoming, United States. US Route 30 is the major road, which leads north  to Cokeville and east  to Kemmerer. Wyoming Highway 89 runs west  to the Utah border, then another  to Sage Creek Junction, Utah. The Union Pacific Railroad passes Sage in the direction of Rock Springs to the east and Pocatello, Idaho, to the west.

Sage lies at  elevation, just west over the Sublette Mountains ridge from Fossil Butte National Monument in the Sage Creek valley.

The Overland Stage Route ran north through Sage from Fort Bridger.

References

Geography of Lincoln County, Wyoming
Ghost towns in Wyoming